Lt. Col. Richard John Vulliamy Battle MBE, FRCS, LRCP, MCh Cantab, MA Cantab, BA Cantab, 1970 Gillies Gold Medal. (21 January 1907 – 26 May 1982) was an English plastic surgeon.

Early life
The son of William Henry Battle and Anna Marguerite (née Vulliamy). Battle was educated at Gresham's School, Norfolk, and Trinity College, Cambridge. His father's family (Battle) were farmers in Potterhanworth and owners of a pharmaceutical chemist business in Lincolnshire.

Career
Following service as a military plastic surgeon during the Second World War for which he was awarded the MBE, Battle was appointed as Consultant Plastic Surgeon to St Thomas Hospital, London, the Westminster Hospital, London, and Queen Elizabeth Hospital(Hackney), London, which he served until his retirement from the NHS in 1972. He also had a small private practice in London. He was Honorary Consultant in Plastic Surgery to the British Army from 1955 to 1971 and President of the British Association of Plastic Surgeons for 1952 and again for 1967.

Military service
Before 1939, he was a member of the Territorial Army and served the War of 1939–1945 in the RAMC. France, 1939–40, Italy, 1943–46. Commanded No. 1 Maxillo Facial Unit and 98 General Hospital. Promoted Major, 1940, and Lieutenant-Colonel, 1945.

Publications
Plastic Surgery (1964)
Many contributions on plastic surgery to scientific periodicals

Professional qualifications
1928: Bachelor of Arts (Cantab.)
1931: MRCS and LRCP
1935: MCh (Cantab.)
1933: FRCS
1935: MA (Cantab.)

Honours
1945: Member of the Order of the British Empire
1970: Gillies Gold Medal

Family
Battle's father was the surgeon William Henry Battle. His father's family (Battle) were farmers in Potterhanworth and owners of a pharmaceutical chemist business in Lincolnshire. In 1941, Battle married Jessie Margaret King, and they had three sons.

See also
William Henry Battle

References
Battle, Richard John Vulliamy in Who Was Who 1897–2006, from Battle, Richard John Vulliamy (accessed 22 August 2007)

1907 births
1982 deaths
Alumni of Trinity College, Cambridge
British plastic surgeons
People educated at Gresham's School
Medical doctors from London
Royal Army Medical Corps officers
British Army personnel of World War II
Fellows of the Royal College of Surgeons
20th-century surgeons